Dewan Chand is a Indo-Fijian educationist, politician and convicted sex abuser.

Chand had been a secondary school principal, and an active member of the Fiji Teachers Union before joining politics. He was elected to Parliament as a Fiji Labour Party candidate in the 2006 Fijian general election, winning 90% of the votes cast in the Laucala Indian Communal Constituency. He lost his seat when parliament was dissolved following the 2006 Fijian coup d'état.

In October 2009, he was re-elected the northern vice president of Fiji Football Association.

In September 2012 he was convicted on indecent assault and defiling a girl under the age of 13 and sentenced to four years imprisonment. The conviction was upheld on appeal. He was subsequently sacked from the Fiji Football Association.

References 

Living people
Year of birth missing (living people)
Fijian trade unionists
Fiji Labour Party politicians
Indian members of the House of Representatives (Fiji)
Fijian Hindus
Politicians from Suva
Fijian criminals
1980 Oceania Cup players
Association footballers not categorized by position
Association football players not categorized by nationality